Judith Feld Carr,  (born 1938) is a Canadian musicologist and human rights activist known for secretly bringing to freedom thousands of Jews out of Syria over a period of 28 years.

Biography
Judith "Judy" Feld Carr was born in Montreal, Quebec, Canada. She attained a Mus.Bac. in music education and the degrees of Mus.M. in both musicology and music education from the University of Toronto. Feld Carr taught high school music in Toronto for many years and also taught university musicology. She was a visiting lecturer at Yeshiva University in New York City, Hebrew University in Jerusalem, and Youngstown State University in Ohio. She also served as President of Beth Tzedec Congregation in 1982–83.

Rescue of Syrian Jewry
Feld Carr used funds from the Dr. Ronald Feld Fund for Jews in Arab Lands (established at Beth Tzedec Congregation, Toronto in 1973), donated privately, both to negotiate ransom for the release of Syrian Jews, from prisons inside Syria and for passports and visas, permitting them to leave, as well as smuggling others across borders and out of that country. The process took over 28 years, in complete secrecy to protect the lives of those in danger, as well as to protect the whole process.  The majority of the Jews who were enabled to leave emigrated to Israel, New York, or South America. Feld Carr described the venture:

Her work focused on creating cells with Syrians temporarily abroad (who almost invariably had to leave family members behind as sureties for their return), those who had escaped, and Syrians inside the country, including Jews, Christians, and Muslims, to develop a reliable and secure information network.   The network used coded language, some of which involved Chinese cuisine and alcohol. Her codename was Gin, but she was also known as Mrs. Judy, or simply "the woman from Canada". Each Syrian Jew was rescued through individual bribes organized by Feld Carr. She recalled, "I bought them like you'd buy cattle...It was as crass and as disgusting a thing as anybody could have ever done." In certain cases, she arranged successful escapes when bribery failed.

Feld Carr facilitated the escape of at least 3,228 Syrian Jews.  In addition, she provided money to assist families of those imprisoned and she was able to smuggle out of that country many rare Jewish religious articles, including the famous Damascus Codex, known as a "Keter" (Crown), which had been written in the 12th century in Italy, found its way to Castile, Constantinople, and eventually Damascus, where it had been kept in secret for some 500 years.  It now rests in the Hebrew National Library on the campus of Hebrew University, Jerusalem.   As the chair of the Canadian Jewish Congress's National Task Force for Syrian Jewry, she publicized the plight of Syrian Jewry, made representations to the Canadian government to admit Syrian Jews temporarily to Canada, and urged it to bring to the attention of the Syrian government its denial of civil and human rights to its Jewish population.

Part of her story is told in  Harold Troper's book, The Ransomed of God: The Remarkable Story Of One Woman's Role in the Rescue of Syrian Jews,  republished by Lester, Mason & Begg under the title The Rescuer: The Amazing True Story of How One Woman Helped Save the Jews of Syria.

Awards and recognition
In June 2012, Feld Carr was one of the first six recipients of The Presidential Award of Distinction of the State of Israel.  The Award was created by President Shimon Peres earlier that year, in order to "recognize outstanding contribution to the Jewish People and the State of Israel".

Feld Carr has received numerous other awards, including the Order of Canada; the Queen's Jubilee Medal in 2002; the Queen Elizabeth II Diamond Jubilee Medal in 2012; the Abram Sachar Medal as "Woman of the Year", Brandeis University; the Saul Hayes Human Rights Award of the Canadian Jewish Congress; the Simon Wiesenthal Award for Tolerance, Justice and Human Rights; and the University of Haifa Humanitarian Award of Merit; Woman of Achievement Award of both Canadian Hadassah and B'nai B'rith Women; Dr Jane Evans Pursuit of Justice Award of Women of Reform Judaism of North America; co-honouree of the Jewish National Fund Negev Dinner, Toronto; Honouree of State of Israel Bonds, Toronto; co-honouree of the Human Rights Award of the Canadian Centre for Diversity.  She has received the honorary degree of Doctor of Laws from Laurentian University and the honorary degree of Doctor of Humane Letters from the Jewish Theological Seminary, New York.

See also
Jewish community of Toronto

References

External links
‘Unbelievable’ story of former Sudburian published twice
Investiture of the Order of Canada, May 31, 2001
Rescuing Syrian Jews
Order of Canada Citation
Mrs. Judy's Secret 
Troper, Harold. "Judy Feld Carr", Jewish Women: A Comprehensive Historical Encyclopedia

1939 births
Anglophone Quebec people
Canadian educators
Canadian humanitarians
Women humanitarians
Living people
Members of the Order of Canada
Jews from Quebec
University of Toronto alumni
Activists from Montreal
Recipients of the Presidential Medal of Distinction of Israel